Raja Kessabny  (born 20 March 1979 in Morocco), or just Rajaa, is a Moroccan singer. In 2006, she won the first ever series of The X Factor, XSeer Al Najah,, the Arab version of The X Factor sponsored by Rotana. In the final, she beat the Egyptian rival Ahmed.

Discography

Albums 
 Tarabiyyat (2006) (Rotana)
Hal al Donia (2007) (Rotana)

Singles 
 Estaghrabt Ihal al Donia (2007) (Rotana)
Moch Helwa Aachano (2008) (Rotana)
Taala Habibi (2009) (Arabica Music)
Illa Oumi (2010) 
Maa Ba3d (2010)
Kassha Makssor (2011) (EMI Productions & Ishot Productions)
Aarouss Ljamal (2011) (EMI Productions & Ishot Productions)
Ze3ma (2015) (First PolyProductions)
Ya Maghreb (2017) (Showi Productions)
Ya Leila (2020) (Lifestyle Studios)

References 

1979 births
Living people
21st-century Moroccan women singers
Rotana Records artists
The X Factor winners
Contestants from Arabic singing competitions